Praz de Lys - Sommand is a twinned ski resort starting at a high altitude and composed of Sommand resort and Praz de Lys resort both linked by ski trails and chair lifts over and around their dividing mountains. Sommand sits high above its village of Mieussy and Praz de Lys sits above Taninges. The ski resort of Les Gets is also nearby Praz de Lys, about 15 minutes drive. It was opened in approximately 1978.

There are 24 ski lifts, 6 chairlifts, beginner's areas in both sides with a child-safe moving carpet lift, and a Snowpark and Boarder cross ski areas on the Sommand side.

Sommand and Praz de Lys permit only low impact minimal infrastructure development to preserve the natural environment and views. The focus is on enjoyment of nature, and new permitted development uses traditional savoyard chalet construction and is within zoned areas naturally screened by pine forests.

Downhill skiing is available at all levels from black runs through gentle family runs. The area also offers cross country ski trails, and walking trails, and maintains a family-oriented focus.

Winter

Ski area

Alpine skiing

Praz de Lys

Sommand

Nordic skiing

Praz de Lys 

Maintained cross country ski run Nordic Skiing
- 2 pistes d'initiation - 3 pistes vertes - 3 pistes bleus - 4 pistes rouges - 3 pistes noires

60 km of cross country skiing.

Winter snow shoeing trails
30 km of snow trails

Nearby peaks 
 Haute-Pointe (1958 m)
 Pointe de Rovagne (1795 m)
 Pointe de Chavannais (1851 m)
 Pointe de Chavasse (2012 m)
 Pointe de Chalune (2116 m)
 Roc d'Enfer (2244 m)
 Pointe d'Uble (1963 m)
 Pointe de Marcelly (1999 m)
 Pointe de la Couennasse (1980 m)
 Pointe de Perret (1941 m)
 Pointe du Haut-Fleury (1981 m)
 Pointe de Véran (1892 m)

Summer activities 
In summer the twinned station often sees road cycle racing including the Tour de France. The annual Col du Ramaz is a race to the top of the pass that lies between the two resorts starting at Mieussy. In winter there is a cross country ski race of the same name.

The area is a protected development nature reserve known for its views to Mont Blanc Massif range. Many hiking trails are available through maps distributed by the tourist offices based in Mieussy or Taninges. Some of the walks include the easy family walk to lac de Roy, the mountain peak of pic de Marcelly, the pointe Chalune, Pointe d'Uble.

In summertime the main chairlift is open to the Haute Fleury for walking and further hiking.

External links 
 
 Sommand - Praz de Lys, photographic view

References 

Ski areas and resorts in France